Miracle Mile is an album by American keyboardist and composer Wayne Horvitz's band The President recorded in 1992 and released on the Elektra/Nonesuch label.

Reception
The Allmusic review awarded the album 3 stars, noting that Miracle Mile featured virtually none of the aggression or fast tempos Horvitz displayed as a member of John Zorn's band Naked City in this era. In contrast, Miracle Mile emphasized subtle compositions that represented a "cross-pollination of jazz, ambient, groove, and modern chamber music".

Track listing
All compositions by Wayne Horvitz
 "The Front" - 5:18   
 "Variations on a Theme by W.C. Handy" - 6:32   
 "I'm Downstairs" - 5:21   
 "Shuffle" - 5:59   
 "And Sing This Song" - 4:14   
 "Yuba City" - 7:36   
 "An Open Letter to George Bush" - 6:52   
 "Miracle Mile" - 5:53

Note: "Variations on a Theme by W.C. Handy" is based on "St. Louis Blues".

Recorded and mixed at Ironwood Studios in Seattle in 1992, with additional recording at Baby Monster Studios and RPM Studios, New York City

Personnel
The President
Wayne Horvitz - keyboards, amplified piano, harmonica
Stew Cutler- guitar
J. A. Deane - trombone, electronics
Kermit Driscoll - electric bass
Bobby Previte - drums
Doug Wieselman - tenor saxophone, clarinet
with guests
Bill Frisell, Elliott Sharp - guitar
Denny Goodhew - saxophones
Ben Steele - guitar controlled sampler

References

Elektra Records albums
Wayne Horvitz albums
1992 albums